Peru Highway 2 is a transversal highway in Peru that connects the cities of Piura and Paita. It is part of the "North Interoceanic Highway". The road is currently concessioned to Concesionaria IIRSA Norte S.A.

References 

Highways in Peru